The 2012 Ukrainian Super Cup became the ninth edition of Ukrainian Super Cup, an annual football match contested by the winners of the previous season's Ukrainian Top League and Ukrainian Cup competitions.

The match was played at the Avanhard Stadium, Luhansk, on 10 July 2012, and contested by league and cup winner Shakhtar Donetsk and cup runner-up Metalurh Donetsk. Shakhtar won it 2–0.

Match

Details

2012
2012–13 in Ukrainian football
FC Metalurh Donetsk matches
FC Shakhtar Donetsk matches
Sport in Luhansk